Wall Nook is a small village in County Durham, in England. It is situated to the south of Langley Park, to the north west of Durham.

Wall Nook is known for its picturesque pastoral scenery in the autumn and was depicted on many nineteenth century lithographs.

References

Villages in County Durham
Langley Park, County Durham